Fadi Shaheen (born 21 June 1979) is a Jordanian football player of Palestinian origin, who plays as a right back for That Ras.

References
 Fadi Shaheen Officially Signs Up for Al-Baqa'a SC 
 Fadi Shaheen: "I Have Recovered With Al-Baqa'a SC From My Injury With Al-Wahdat... and I Hope to Play With Ra'fat Ali and Retire!" 
 Fadi Shaheen Transfers to That Ras

External links
 
 

1979 births
Living people
Association football midfielders
Jordanian footballers
Jordan international footballers
Jordanian people of Palestinian descent
Sportspeople from Amman